Hercules was a wooden roller coaster located at Dorney Park & Wildwater Kingdom in Allentown, Pennsylvania. Manufactured by the Dinn Corporation and designed by Curtis D. Summers, the roller coaster opened to the public on May 6, 1989. Hercules was the third wooden coaster to be constructed at the park. A scenic railway operated at Dorney from 1905 to 1912. The park's existing wooden coaster, known simply as "Coaster" opened in 1924 and was remodeled in 1930. With the opening of Hercules, the existing coaster was given a formal name — Thunderhawk.

History
In the 1980s Dorney Park had been making plans to add a significant attraction. Chairman of the Board and Dorney Park CEO Harris Weinstein decided that he wanted the park to have a world-class wooden coaster. Engineer Curtis Summers visited the park in 1987 to survey the site and start formulating a layout. 
On July 15, 1988, Dorney Park announced that a new wooden roller coaster would be opening for the 1989 season. The announcement specified it would be located toward the back of the park near the lake. The park revealed its name, Hercules, in March 1989, stating that it would be themed to the Greek god of the same name. The coaster had its first riders during testing on April 14, 1989. A media preview was held on May 4, and the coaster opened to the public on May 6, 1989.

Description
Summers took advantage of the hillside location to produce a record-breaking drop from a modest 95-foot lift hill. As the train left the station it veered to the left as it descended nearly 50 feet then made a right-hand 180 degree turn to align with the lift hill that was parallel to the station. After climbing the lift, the train encountered a small dip, a turn to the left and then the massive 151-foot drop down the hillside. At the bottom of the hill the train raced at 65 mph through a highly-banked, right-hand turn that swooped out over the park's lake. Upon completion of the 180-degree the train entered a triple-up to climb back up the hillside. Once over the top, riders encountered an air-time drop under the station house then a rise into a high-banked right turn. The next few drops were small and uneventful as the track led riders past the station. Another high right-hand turn was followed by a decent drop of 40 to 50 feet before the train hopped up onto the holding brake.

Modifications
During testing the coaster had difficulty climbing out of the valley, occasionally coming to a stop on the anti-rollbacks at the top of the triple-up. On media day members of the Dinn crew were stationed at the high point of the triple-up for the first runs of the day to make certain the train cleared the top of the hill. After the first few weekends of operation, the top of the hill was lowered by three feet. Hercules was running with a new PTC train design that featured six, four-seat cars coupled together with a trailer hitch. Unfortunately the hitch point was too far back from the rear wheel axle of each car which caused the cars to oscillate in a side-to-side motion. Since these new trains coincided with the first Dinn and Summers coasters, this shaking became known to enthusiasts as the "Dinn shuffle." Summers had calculated the perfect angle for the high-speed turn at the bottom of the first drop, but with all the forces directed downward toward the bottom of the rails, the train hunted side to side trying to find the right path along the rails. This motion was only aggravated by the design of the trailered PTC trains. Eventually, the banking angle of the turn was lessened to keep the guide wheels pressed against the outside rail, but the turn remained problematic requiring frequent retracking and reinforcement. The trailered trains were eventually replaced with articulating trains and by year five a trim brake was added to the top of the drop. In 1994, park owner Cedar Fair contracted John F. Pierce Associates to make several off-season modifications. The triple-up was converted to a double-up and lowered even further. The drop under the station was reduced. The trim brake at the top of the drop was set higher to reduce the speed even more. During its operating life, the ride was re-tracked multiple times by Martin & Vleminckx.

Demise
Following the 1994 modifications, the coaster continued to lose its popularity and ridership waned. Hercules closed for the season on September 1, 2003. Just two days later on September 3, Dorney Park announced that Hercules would be replaced by a new steel roller coaster scheduled to open in 2005. Hercules' site is now occupied by Hydra the Revenge. The park's other wooden coaster, Thunderhawk, continues to operate and is approaching its 100th anniversary.

Remnants of Hercules can still be found. Several remaining concrete footings can be spotted throughout the backside of the park.

Tallest coaster controversy
When Dorney Park signed the contract with the Dinn Corporation to build Hercules, a clause was included stating the company would not build a larger coaster for the next two years. The following year, Six Flags Over Texas contracted Dinn to build Texas Giant, which featured a 143-foot lift hill with a 137-foot drop. Six Flags claimed to have the world's tallest wooden roller coaster, which technically it did since the top of Hercules' lift hill was only 95-feet off the ground. Dorney Park filed a federal lawsuit against Six Flags over which park had the rights to claim having the "world's tallest coaster." Dorney also demanded that Six Flags halt all advertising and was seeking $50,000 in compensatory damages. A trial was scheduled in Philadelphia and on the day of the trial, U.S. District Court Judge Franklin Van Antwerpen summoned both parties into his chambers where the suit was quietly settled. Hercules could lay claim to having the tallest drop, and Texas Giant would be known as having the tallest coaster structure.

References

Roller coasters operated by Cedar Fair
Former roller coasters in Pennsylvania